Groble may refer to the following places in Poland:
Groble, Lower Silesian Voivodeship (south-west Poland)
Groble, Subcarpathian Voivodeship (south-east Poland)